Khatanbulag is a sum (district) of Dornogovi Province in south-eastern Mongolia. It is the site of the restored Khamar Monastery that was built in 1820, destroyed in the Communist purges of 1937, and rebuilt after the Mongolian Revolution of 1990.

References 

Districts of Dornogovi Province